Neisi Patricia Barrera Dájomes (born 12 May 1998) is an Ecuadorian weightlifter, 2020 Tokyo 76 kg Olympic Champion, 4 time Pan American Champion, Pan American Games Champion and 3 time Junior World Champion competing 75 kg category until 2018 and 76 kg starting in 2018 after the International Weightlifting Federation reorganized the categories. She is the older sister of Angie Palacios.

Career
She competed in the women's 69 kg event at the 2016 Summer Olympics, finishing seventh overall.

She became junior world champion in 2017 in the 75 kg division, and defended her title in 2018. She won a silver medal at the 2017 World Championships in the 75 kg division, and a bronze medal at the 2018 World Weightlifting Championships in the 76 kg. At the 2018 World Weightlifting Championships she set junior world records in the snatch, clean & jerk and total.

In April 2019 she competed at the 2019 Pan American Weightlifting Championships winning gold medals in the snatch, clean & jerk and the total. Later in 2019 she competed at the 2019 Pan American Games in the 76 kg division. In the snatch portion of the competition she lifted 115 kg with her third, and final lift. She led Aremi Fuentes by a full 5 kg when the clean & jerk portion began, and lifted 140 kg with her final lift and clinched the gold medal.

She was the gold medalist in the women's 76 kg event at the 2020 Summer Olympics.

She won the gold medal in the women's 81 kg event at the 2022 Pan American Weightlifting Championships held in Bogotá, Colombia. She also won the gold medals in the Snatch and Clean & Jerk events in this competition. She won two gold medals at the 2022 Bolivarian Games held in Valledupar, Colombia. She won the gold medal in her event at the 2022 South American Games held in Asunción, Paraguay.

Achievements

References

External links
 

1998 births
Living people
Ecuadorian female weightlifters
Olympic weightlifters of Ecuador
Weightlifters at the 2016 Summer Olympics
Weightlifters at the 2020 Summer Olympics
Pan American Games medalists in weightlifting
Pan American Games silver medalists for Ecuador
World Weightlifting Championships medalists
Weightlifters at the 2015 Pan American Games
South American Games gold medalists for Ecuador
South American Games medalists in weightlifting
Competitors at the 2018 South American Games
Competitors at the 2022 South American Games
Weightlifters at the 2019 Pan American Games
Medalists at the 2015 Pan American Games
Medalists at the 2019 Pan American Games
Pan American Weightlifting Championships medalists
Medalists at the 2020 Summer Olympics
Olympic medalists in weightlifting
Olympic gold medalists for Ecuador
21st-century Ecuadorian women